The Rokes were a pop rock band formed in 1963 in Italy by English expatriates. Their most successful songs included "Piangi con Me", the original version of "Let's Live for Today", a US hit when re-recorded by The Grass Roots; and "Che Colpa Abbiamo Noi", an Italian language version of "Cheryl's Going Home" by Bob Lind.

Career
Norman David "Shel" Shapiro (born 16 August 1943, Stanmore, Middlesex) began performing in London as a guitarist and singer with rock and roll band Rob Storm & the Whispers. After a spell playing in Gene Vincent's backing band during a tour of Britain in 1959, Shapiro decided to form his own band, The Shel Carson Combo, with guitarist Vic Briggs (14 February 1945, Twickenham, Middlesex – 25 June 2021), drummer Mike Shepstone (born 29 March 1943, Weymouth, Dorset), and bassist Bobby Posner (born 6 May 1945, Edgware, Middlesex). 
 
The band performed rhythm and blues in clubs around London and had regular shows at American base camps around the south of England plus a couple of tours in the north including Scotland, before deciding to try their luck in the club scene in continental Europe. In January 1963, they travelled to Germany, where they had a residency at the Top Ten Club in Hamburg with a short stay at the TopTen Club in Hanover. The band were then invited to tour Italy as the backing group for Colin Hicks, the brother of Tommy Steele. Guitarist Vic Briggs left the group, preferring to stay in England, and was replaced by Johnny Charlton (born 3 April 1945, Walthamstow, London). The group toured around Italy with Hicks, increasingly performing more of their own material.

In June 1963, they broke their ties with Hicks and were signed up by Teddy Reno, the manager and husband of Italian pop singer Rita Pavone. They toured with Pavone, appearing as the Shel Carson Combo warming up the fans before Rita did her show.  They then gained a recording contract with the ARC label and renamed themselves The Rokes for their first single, a cover version of Big Joe Turner's "Shake, Rattle and Roll", was unsuccessful, but the band established themselves with a club residency in Rome at The Piper Club. The Rokes completed a series of short commercial videos on Italian TV (Algida).On later recordings, they sang mainly in English-accented Italian, often recording versions of American and British chart hits. In 1965, their version of Jackie DeShannon's "When You Walk in the Room" ("C'e Una Strana Espressione Nei Tuoi Occhi"), reached no. 11 on the Italian charts, followed by "Grazie a Te", a cover of "I'm Alive" by The Hollies.

In 1966, they were voted the second most popular beat group in Italy, after further hits with versions of Bob Lind's songs "Cheryl's Going Home" ("Che Colpa Abbiamo Noi") and "Remember The Rain" ("E La Pioggia Che Va"). The B-side of "Che Colpa Abbiamo Noi" was a song Shapiro co-wrote with Italian lyricist Mogol, "Piangi Con Me". The group re-recorded the song in English, as "Let's Live for Today", with English lyrics and title by Michael Julien of Dick James Music.  Worldwide sales of "Piangi Con Me" exceeded one million copies, qualifying for a gold disc. It was released in England at the same time as a cover version by another English band, The Living Daylights. The song was heard by American record producers P. F. Sloan and Steve Barri, and successfully recorded by them with The Grass Roots.

The Rokes released four albums between 1965 and 1968, and continued to record successfully in Italy. They also toured and appeared regularly on Italian TV shows and in several of the annual Sanremo Festival events. They ventured into psychedelic rock in 1968 with Il vento (The Wind) (by Mogol and Lucio Battisti), also recorded in English as "When the Wind Arises" lyrics by Mike Shepstone (RCA Victor - 1694) published in the double album of 2000 I grandi successi originali (The Original Big Hits) (RCA Records – 74321750222 (2)), and recorded a version of The Equals' UK hit "Baby Come Back" ("Non c'è pace per me"). However, their records had little success outside Italy due to RCA/ARC's lack of publicity. With changing tastes and declining sales, the group disbanded in 1970, having sold more than 5 million records. They continue to sell CD compilations and box sets.

Later activities
Shapiro continued to compose and perform his own music. He recorded seven albums and embarked on an acting career, working with directors such as Mario Monicelli and Marco Risi. In 1977 he founded his own label in Milan. In 2018 he recorded an album with former rival and Equipe 84 lead vocalist Maurizio Vandelli. Johnny Charlton opened his own art gallery, Galleria Charlton, in Rome. He now works as a visual artist. Bobby Posner and Mike Shepstone initially returned to England. Posner bought various pubs in London and eventually sold these and moved to Hastings on the south coast where he acquired other music pubs. He never stopped playing and performed in different rock, reggae, and blues bands. Mike Shepstone formed the duo 'Shepstone and Dibbens', toured with AC/DC and continued to write songs as well for other artists. In 2000, serious discussions about putting the band back together for an Italian tour gained momentum. However, Shapiro and Charlton weren't interested, so Posner and Shepstone decided to form 'The Rokes M&B' (Mike and Bobby). They have been playing regularly in Italy since 2000. In 2013 Posner moved permanently back to Italy and now lives with his fiancee Paola Salvadeo in Novi Ligure (AL).

Discography

Albums
1965 - The Rokes (ARC, SA 4)
1966 - The Rokes vol. 2 (ARC, SA 8)
1966 - Che mondo strano (ARC, SA 15)
1968 - The Rokes (ARC, ALPS 11006)

Singles

References

External links
 The Rokes official site (files from original url)
 The Rokes Discography
 
 
 Shel Shapiro official site
  Johnny Charlton Art official site
 The Rokes – MySpace page
 The Rokes site, managed by Bobby Posner
 The Rokes site, managed by Mike Shepstone and Bobby Posner
 The Rokes Fans Club Italy – YouTube

English rock music groups
Italian rock music groups
Musical groups established in 1963
Musical groups disestablished in 1970
Beat groups